Carl Julius Pedersen (25 July 1883 – 18 August 1971) was a Danish gymnast who competed in the 1912 Summer Olympics. He was part of the Danish team, which won the bronze medal in the gymnastics men's team, free system event. In the individual all-around competition he finished 34th.

References

1883 births
1971 deaths
Danish male artistic gymnasts
Gymnasts at the 1912 Summer Olympics
Olympic gymnasts of Denmark
Olympic bronze medalists for Denmark
Olympic medalists in gymnastics
Medalists at the 1912 Summer Olympics